Global Conflicts: Palestine was developed by Danish studio Serious Games Interactive for Mac OS X and Microsoft Windows. A sequel, Global Conflicts: Latin America, was released in 2008.

Summary
The player assumes the role of a freelance journalist who has just arrived in Jerusalem facing  challenges. The goal is to create and get an article published for a newspaper by collecting quotes from the dialog in the game. The player can either get information by building up trust with each side or take a more confrontational approach to dig out information. In the end, the story with the most news-value will get the best exposure.  The player must be careful what they submit for print, because it will affect their standings with both sides.

The game attempts to challenge the player's beliefs and ideas about the conflict.  The game has support for educational use with features like an encyclopedia, primary sources, assessment and a teacher's manual.

The game is one in a series of serious games made by Serious Games Interactive, under the joint title "Global Conflicts".

Reception 

In 2010 it was awarded a BETT Award in the category of "Secondary, FE & Skills Digital Content" for its flagship title Global Conflicts: Palestine.

See also 
 Conflict: Middle East Political Simulator

References

External links
 "Middle-East conflict informs game" article from the BBC

2007 video games
Humanitarian video games
MacOS games
Video games developed in Denmark
Windows games
Israeli–Palestinian conflict in popular culture
Video games set in Jerusalem